Thomas Yatsko is an American cinematographer and television director, known for his work on television series like CSI: Miami, Brothers & Sisters, and Fringe.

Career
In his capacity as a cinematographer, Yatsko has worked on the television series CSI: Miami, E-Ring, Alias, Brothers & Sisters, and Touch.

In late 2011 he signed with Global Artists Agency.

Fringe
Yatsko worked as director of photography on the FOX science-fiction Fringe, alternating episodes with cinematographer David Moxness. Yatsko has recently taken to directing several Fringe episodes, including "White Tulip", "6B", and "The Last Sam Weiss". The A.V. Club critic Noel Murray praised Yatsko's directional work for the series, explaining in his review of "6B" that Yatsko was "previously the director of the excellent 'White Tulip.' This wasn’t such a great episode, but Yatsko’s one to keep an eye on. His eps have a nice, burnished look, and I can’t complain about the performances either, which have struck me as very measured and connected." After the completion of the third season, Yatsko left the series.

Filmography

Theatrical Films
Cinematographer

Television
Cinematographer

Director

References

External links
 

Living people
American cinematographers
American television directors
Year of birth missing (living people)